The Durrell Institute of Conservation and Ecology (DICE) is a subdivision and research centre of the School of Anthropology and Conservation at the University of Kent, started in 1989 and named in honour of the famous British naturalist Gerald Durrell. It was the first institute in the United Kingdom to award undergraduate and postgraduate degrees and diplomas in the fields of conservation biology, ecotourism, and biodiversity management. It consists of 22 academic staff, being six Professors, seven Readers and nine Lecturers and Senior Lecturers, as well as an Advisory Board consisting of 14 conservationists from government, business and the NGO sector.

History
DICE's graduate degree programme began in 1991 with a class of seven international students. Since then it has trained over 1,200 people from 101 countries, including 322 people from Lower- and Middle-Income countries in Africa, Asia, Oceania and South America. The founder of DICE is Professor Ian Swingland, who retired from the University of Kent in 1999, and the first Director was Dr. Mike Walkey, who retired in 2002.

Awards
In 2019 DICE was awarded a Queen's Anniversary Prize for "pioneering education, capacity building and research in global nature conservation to protect species and ecosystems and benefit people".

Alumni
Notable alumni include:

Bahar Dutt, Indian television journalist and environmental editor
Sanjay Gubbi, Indian conservation biologist
Rachel Ikemeh, Nigerian conservationist
Winnie Kiiru, Kenyan biologist and elephant conservationist
Patricia Medici, Brazilian conservation biologist
Jeanneney Rabearivony, Malagasy ecologist and herpetologist
Rajeev Raghavan, Indian conservation biologist
Alexandra Zimmermann, wildlife conservationist

References

Ecology organizations
Environmental research institutes
Research institutes in Kent
University of Kent